Perfume is a mixture of fragrant essential oils and aroma compounds, fixatives, and solvents used to give a pleasant smell.

Perfume may also refer to:

Music
 Perfume (Japanese band), a Japanese pop group from Hiroshima
 Perfume (UK band), a UK indie band

Songs and albums
 "Perfume" (Parade song), a 2011 song from the album Parade
 "Perfume" (Britney Spears song), a 2013 song from the album Britney Jean
 Perfume, a 1992 album by Megumi Hayashibara
 "Perfume", a 2006 song by Perfume from the album Perfume: Complete Best
 "Perfume", a 2006 song by Sparks from the album Hello Young Lovers
 "Perfume", a 2007 song by Yuna Ito from the album Heart
 "Perfume", a 2021 song by Lovejoy from the EP Pebble Brain

Other uses
 Perfume (2001 film), a 2001 film starring Paul Sorvino
 Perfume (novel), a 1985 novel by Patrick Süskind
 Perfume: The Story of a Murderer (film), a 2006 film based on the novel
 Perfume (2018 TV series), a 2018 German TV series, inspired by both the novel and the 2006 film
 Perfume Pagoda, a buddhist temple complexes in northern Vietnam
 Perfume River, a river in central Vietnam
 Perfume (South Korean TV series), a 2019 South Korean TV series
 Perfumes (film), a 2019 French film